Hua Hin City Football Club, is a Thai professional football club based in Prachuap Khiri Khan Province. The club was founded in 2011. The club is currently playing in the Thai League 3 Western region.

Stadium and locations

Season-by-season record

 The club withdrew after 4 games in 2016
 The FA of Thailand Regional League authorities initially banned the club for 2 years and relegated them to play in Division 3 West zone starting in the 2018 season
 However the club returned to play in Regional League Division 2 Western region in 2016 after the two parties were able to settle the issue.

P = Played
W = Games won
D = Games drawn
L = Games lost
F = Goals for
A = Goals against
Pts = Points
Pos = Final position

QR1 = First Qualifying Round
QR2 = Second Qualifying Round
R1 = Round 1
R2 = Round 2
R3 = Round 3
R4 = Round 4

R5 = Round 5
R6 = Round 6
QF = Quarter-finals
SF = Semi-finals
RU = Runners-up
W = Winners

Players

Current squad

Honours

Domestic leagues
Thai League 4 Western Region
 Winners (1) : 2019
Regional League Central-West Division
 Winners (1) : 2014
Khǒr Royal Cup (ถ้วย ข.)
 Runner-up : 2012

References

External links
 
 Hua Hin City Website
 T4 (West) Stadiums

Association football clubs established in 2011
Football clubs in Thailand
Prachuap Khiri Khan province
2011 establishments in Thailand